Martin Andre Nurse (born 11 June 1985, in Durants, Barbados), is a West Indian cricketer who played in the 2004 U-19 Cricket World Cup in Bangladesh. He has also played first-class and List A cricket for Barbados.

References

1985 births
Living people
Barbadian cricketers
Barbados cricketers
Combined Campuses and Colleges cricketers
West Indies B cricketers